Veda is a 2010 Turkish biographical film, written and directed by Zülfü Livaneli based on the memoirs of Salih Bozok, which traces the life of Mustafa Kemal Atatürk.

Production
Filming commenced on 27 October 2009 with location shooting taking place in Antalya, Ayvalık, Izmir and Seferihisar, Turkey.

Cast
Sinan Tuzcu as Atatürk (age 25–45) 
Serhat Kılıç as Salih Bozok (age 30–57) 
Dolunay Soysert as Zübeyde Hanım
Özge Özpirinçci as Fikriye Hanım 
Ezgi Mola as Latife Hanım 
Burhan Güven as Atatürk (age 57)
Kaan Olcay as Atatürk (age 6–7)
Bartunç Akbaba as Atatürk (age 14–17)
Erk Bilgiç as Cevat Abbas
Orhan Aydın as Kurmay Başkanı
Mehmet Erbil as İsmail Hakkı Tekçe

Release

General release

Festival screenings
 5th Kaunos Golden Lion Film Festival (July 31-August 6, 2010) – closing film

Reception

Box office
The movie has made a total gross of $5,191,199.

Reviews
"How hard is it to make an Atatürk film, one that will make everyone happy," ponders Emine Yıldırım, writing in Today's Zaman, "something that will genuinely show the extraordinary might of a political and military leader and at the same time present the ordinariness of a human being who shows a capacity for fear? From beginning to finish, 'Veda' is the loyal portrayal of the demi-god statue that we have been reading about in history books since we were 5 years old," he continues. "Sure he is made flesh-and-bone via a handful of actors of different ages (Sinan Tuzcu in particular steals most of the screen time portraying the ages 25-45), but they are just mere vessels for dialogue and quotes that we have been reciting since… forever.

The real problematic part of 'Veda' is that while trying to illustrate every aspect of the life of Atatürk (his political and military career, his relationship with his friends and family) the film lacks a focal point and manifests itself as a string of sketches molded out of the sources of documented history. “What is this story really about?” one wonders while observing the meticulous and authentic production design. Surely, he concedes, the technical qualities of the film are outstanding, but do we not already expect that as a given in a historical production such as this? Furthermore, does this sanctify the film as a good film in itself?

'Veda' will surely make an explosion at the local box office; it's the kind of massive epic drama that audiences anticipate when it comes to national history, he further concedes. Those who were enraged by Can Dündar's overtly personal and humanizing take on Atatürk last year with his feature length docu-drama 'Mustafa' will be highly satisfied by writer-musician-film director Zülfü Livaneli's epic historic drama 'Veda,' which aims to stroke our pride in Turkey's founding leader by preferring to pass over any erring human ways that Mustafa Kemal might have harbored. However, he concludes, an Atatürk movie of deeper context ingrained with a fresh approach is yet to be produced."

See also 
 Mustafa, a 2008 biographical film directed by Can Dündar
 Dersimiz: Atatürk, a 2010 biographical film directed by Hamdi Alkan
 2010 in film
 Turkish films of 2010

References

External links
 

2010 films
Turkish historical drama films
2010s historical drama films
Films set in the 1900s
Films set in the 1910s
Films set in the 1920s
Films set in the 1930s
2010 biographical drama films
Cultural depictions of Mustafa Kemal Atatürk
Films set in Turkey
Films set in Istanbul
Turkish War of Independence films
Turkish biographical drama films
Films set in İzmir
Films shot in İzmir
2010 drama films